Stigmella ultima is a moth of the family Nepticulidae. It is found in eastern Asia, including the Primorye region in Russia and in Japan. It is probably also present in north-eastern China.

The larvae feed on Acer mono and Acer platanoides.

External links
Japanese Moths

Nepticulidae
Moths of Asia
Moths described in 1984